Iuliu Darok (born 1924, date of death unknown) was a Romanian footballer who played as a defender.

International career
Iuliu Darok played two matches for Romania, making his debut on 12 October 1947 under coach Ferenc Rónay in a 3–0 loss against Hungary. His second game was a friendly which ended 0–0 against Poland.

Honours
Dermata Cluj
Divizia B: 1946–47

References

External links
 

1924 births
Year of death missing
Romanian footballers
Romania international footballers
Place of birth missing
Association football defenders
Liga I players
Liga II players
FC Rapid București players
CA Oradea players